The McKees Rocks Bridge is a steel trussed through arch bridge which carries the Blue Belt, Pittsburgh's innermost beltline, across the Ohio River at Brighton Heights and McKees Rocks, Pennsylvania, west of the city.

Built in 1931, it was listed on the National Register of Historic Places in 1988.

See also
List of bridges documented by the Historic American Engineering Record in Pennsylvania
List of crossings of the Ohio River

References

External links

McKees Rocks Bridge at pghbridges.com
McKees Rocks Bridge at HistoricBridges.org

Bridges over the Ohio River
Bridges in Allegheny County, Pennsylvania
Open-spandrel deck arch bridges in the United States
Through arch bridges in the United States
Bridges completed in 1931
Road bridges on the National Register of Historic Places in Pennsylvania
Pittsburgh History & Landmarks Foundation Historic Landmarks
Historic American Engineering Record in Pennsylvania
National Register of Historic Places in Allegheny County, Pennsylvania
Steel bridges in the United States
1931 establishments in Pennsylvania